Carrea is one of thirteen parishes (administrative divisions) in Teverga, a municipality within the province and autonomous community of Asturias, in northern Spain.  

The postal code is 33111.

The other parish divisions of Teverga
Barrio (Barriu; Bairru)
La Focella (La Fouciecha; La Foceicha)
La Plaza
Páramo (Parmu)
Riello (Rieḷḷu)
San Salvador d'Alesga
Santianes
Taja (Taxa)
Torce
Urria
Villamayor (Viḷḷamor)
Villanueva (Viḷḷanueva; Viḷḷanuöva)

Villages and hamlets
 Carrea
 Sobrevilla (Sorvilla)

References

Parishes in Teverga